Lynn Ellen MacLaren (born 24 March 1962) is an American-born former Australian politician.

Early life
MacLaren was born in Colorado Springs and studied journalism at university in California, where she began a career in journalism as the chief photographer and staff reporter for two small California daily newspapers, the Desert Dispatch and the Victor Valley Daily Press.

After studying as a Rotary Youth Exchange student in 1979 in Albany, MacLaren relocated to Perth in 1982 and spent seven years in small business as a desktop publisher and technical writer. In the mid 1990s, MacLaren was prominent in the campaign to put live animal exports on the public agenda and was the foundation president of the People Against Cruelty in Animal Transport, also serving on the executive board of Animals Australia.

From 1997, MacLaren worked for Jim Scott MLC and did project work with the Environmental Defender's Office, and the Community Housing Coalition (WA). She later worked as a researcher for Giz Watson MLC.

Political career
On 15 February 2005, she was elected to the Western Australian Legislative Council as a Greens Western Australia member for South Metropolitan Region, following Jim Scott's resignation to contest the lower house seat of Fremantle. MacLaren was defeated at the 2005 state election.

After politics
From 2005 to 2008, MacLaren Senior Policy Officer with the Western Australian Council of Social Service, where she specialised in policy areas of poverty, housing and sector viability. She also worked as a consultant in strategic planning and capacity building for community organisations.

Return to politics
MacLaren contested again in the 2008 state election for South Metropolitan Region and was successful. MacLaren's first full term began in May 2009. She contested the 2013 state election and was re-elected.

MacLaren's portfolios included: planning, housing, community services, social inclusion, heritage, animals, volunteering, seniors, disability issues, food and GMOs, sexuality, tourism, arts and culture, small business and science and innovation.

MacLaren has introduced several private members bills in her portfolio areas: Climate Change Readiness Coastal Planning and Protection Bill, Same-Sex Marriage Bill, Free Range Eggs Truth in Labelling Bill, Road Traffic Amendment Keeping a Safe Distance from Bicycles Bill, Biodiversity Conservation Priority Reforms Bill.

She has served as a Member of the Environment and Public Affairs Committee and the Legislation Committee. While on the EPAC, MacLaren participated in an inquiry into the Transportation of Detained Persons which followed on from the death in a custodial van of Aboriginal man, Mr Ward, who was being transported in the hot conditions of northern Western Australia. She made a Minority Report in one the committee's Petition Report opposing the expansion of urban development in Moore River.

MacLaren was defeated at the 2017 state election.

References

1962 births
Living people
Australian Greens members of the Parliament of Western Australia
Members of the Western Australian Legislative Council
American emigrants to Australia
21st-century Australian politicians
21st-century Australian women politicians
LGBT legislators in Australia
Women members of the Western Australian Legislative Council